Norman Sherry FRSL (6 July 1925 – 19 October 2016) was an English novelist, biographer, and educator who was best known for his three-volume biography of the British novelist Graham Greene. He was professor of English literature at Lancaster University. During World War Two, he served in Burma.

Sherry was born in Newcastle Upon Tyne, England, the younger twin (by eleven minutes) of Alan. He was a Fellow of the Royal Society of Literature.  He also wrote on Joseph Conrad, Charlotte and Emily Brontë, and Jane Austen.  His Life of Graham Greene was praised by David Lodge for being "a remarkable and heroic achievement" that he predicted would prove "the definitive biography of record" of Greene.

From 1983, Sherry held the post of Mitchell Distinguished Professor of Literature at Trinity University in San Antonio, Texas.

He was married three times: first to the children's novelist Sylvia Sherry, then to Carmen Flores (with whom he had a son and a daughter), and finally to Pat Villalon. Sherry died on 19 October 2016 at the age of 91.

Bibliography

Books

Critical studies and reviews
 Review of volume 2 of The life of Graham Greene.

References

 https://www.nytimes.com/2004/11/04/books/04gree.html

External links
Obituary at Trinity University website
1989 audio interview with Norman Sherry about Graham Greene by Don Swaim 

1925 births
2016 deaths
Edgar Award winners
Fellows of the Royal Society of Literature
English novelists
English biographers
Trinity University (Texas) faculty
People from Newcastle upon Tyne